Euro Space Center is a science museum and educational tourist attraction located in Wallonia in the village of Transinne, munipality of Libin, Belgium. It is devoted to space science and astronautics. 

The centre includes simulators of space flight and micro-gravity. It is the home of the only full-scale mock-up of a U.S. Space Shuttle existing in Europe, named Amicitia.

Gallery

See also
 Belgian Federal Science Policy Office (BELSPO)
 Belgian Institute for Space Aeronomy
 European Space Agency
 Space Center

External links
Official website (English)
Archived website (English)

Museums in Luxembourg (Belgium)
Space-related tourist attractions
Space Shuttle tourist attractions
Libin, Belgium
Science museums